Operation Noble Obelisk was the U.S. evacuation of civilians from Sierra Leone in 1997 by the American naval ship USS Kearsarge (LHD-3) and the 22nd Marine Expeditionary Unit.

On the 25 May 1997, rebel forces and military officers overthrew the government of President Ahmed Tejan Kabbah of Sierra Leone.  At that time, a U.S. Army Special Forces detachment was deployed in Sierra Leone for joint training exercises.  

After the coup d'etat, the Special Forces moved to Freetown to secure the U.S. Embassy and its two residential compounds. The detachment also identified an appropriate location for a helicopter landing zone near the embassy. (HLZ). The Special Forces also provided the Marine Expeditionary commander with "real-time" intelligence on conditions in Freetown. Major General Samuel T. Helland was designated as Commander, Joint Task Force Noble Obelisk.

US forces evacuated 2509 people to the Kearsarge over a four-day period.  The evacuees included 454 American citizens and third-country nationals. 

The Marine 1st Battalion, 2nd Regiment out of Camp Lejeune, North Carolina participated in the Noncombatants Evacuation Operation (NEO), as well as the Marine Medium Tiltrotor Squadron 261. Naval Air Reservists provided logistical support.

References

External links
 Photo of CH-53 Sea Stallion with evacuees
 Photo of evacuee arriving aboard the Kearsage

Sierra Leone Civil War
United States Marine Corps in the 20th century
Non-combatant evacuation operations